Dago Red is a North American P-51 Mustang (44-74996), restored as a competitive air racer by Frank Taylor in 1981. Dago Red holds several world records, including the 15 km (517.323 mph) set in 1983. Frank Taylor piloted the plane to most of its world records in the 1980s.

Awards
 Six time winner of the National Championship Air Races (1982, 1998, 1999, 2000, 2002 and 2003)
 Mojave, California 1983 - World Speed Record 15 km (517.323 mph)
 Unlimited Reno Air Races 1982 - Gold Winner
 Reno Air Races 2003 - Thompson Trophy, Fastest Lap (512.164 mph), Fastest Race (507.105 mph)
 Reno Air Races 2001 - Fastest Qualifying Speed (497.797 mph)

Specifications

See also
Miss Ashley II
Precious Metal
Rare Bear
Red Baron
September Fury
The Galloping Ghost
Tsunami
Voodoo

External links
 Reno Air Racing Association
 P-51 Mustang Survivors

Racing aircraft
Individual aircraft
North American P-51 Mustang
Aircraft first flown in 1981